Pareho Tayo (lit. We Are the Same) is a song written and performed by Gloc-9. It was released independently and is currently available in digital format (free download) through SoundCloud account of the artist.

Background 
The song can be downloaded for free through Gloc-9's official SoundCloud account. It is the second song of Gloc-9 to be released independently after the song Payag. The song tackles how one person could relate to what other people go through in their everyday lives, despite their personal differences. Also, some national issues were mentioned in the song like lining up in train stations and how students struggle to finish their studies.

Commercial performance 
The song had almost 600 downloads and 8,000 hits in span of one and a half days after its upload.

References

External links
 Pareho Tayo in SoundCloud

Gloc-9 songs
2016 songs
Songs written by Gloc-9
Tagalog-language songs